Sacred Heart is a city in Renville County, Minnesota, United States. The population was 548 at the 2010 census.

History
Sacred Heart was platted in 1878. The 1914 Hotel Sacred Heart is listed on the National Register of Historic Places.

Geography
It is the westernmost town in  Renville County.

U.S. Route 212 serves as a main route in the community.

Demographics

2010 census
As of the census of 2010, there were 548 people, 235 households, and 139 families living in the city. The racial makeup of the city was 98.5% White, 0.2% African American, 0.9% Native American, and 0.4% from other races. Hispanic or Latino of any race were 9.1% of the population.

There were 235 households, of which 29.4% had children under the age of 18 living with them, 42.1% were married couples living together, 9.8% had a female householder with no husband present, 7.2% had a male householder with no wife present, and 40.9% were non-families. 35.7% of all households were made up of individuals, and 19.2% had someone living alone who was 65 years of age or older. The average household size was 2.33 and the average family size was 3.08.

The median age in the city was 36.6 years. 26.3% of residents were under the age of 18; 6.8% were between the ages of 18 and 24; 24.2% were from 25 to 44; 24.8% were from 45 to 64; and 17.9% were 65 years of age or older. The gender makeup of the city was 48.5% male and 51.5% female.

2000 census
As of the census of 2000, there were 549 people, 246 households, and 147 families living in the city. The racial makeup of the city was 97.45% White, 0.18% Native American, 1.46% from other races, and 0.91% from two or more races. Hispanic or Latino of any race were 7.10% of the population.

There were 246 households, out of which 24.0% had children under the age of 18 living with them, 51.6% were married couples living together, 6.1% had a female householder with no husband present, and 40.2% were non-families. 36.6% of all households were made up of individuals, and 18.7% had someone living alone who was 65 years of age or older. The average household size was 2.23 and the average family size was 2.94.

In the city, the population was spread out, with 24.6% under the age of 18, 7.1% from 18 to 24, 23.0% from 25 to 44, 23.3% from 45 to 64, and 22.0% who were 65 years of age or older. The median age was 42 years. For every 100 females, there were 87.4 males. For every 100 females age 18 and over, there were 84.8 males.

The median income for a household in the city was $32,333, and the median income for a family was $40,313. Males had a median income of $28,654 versus $22,019 for females. The per capita income for the city was $18,089. About 5.4% of families and 10.9% of the population were below the poverty line, including 21.0% of those under age 18 and none of those age 65 or over.

Recreation 
Sacred Heart has a state of the art baseball complex where the local Saints team plays baseball.  Next door to the baseball field is an outdoor ice skating rink maintained in the winter months.

There is one primary park in town that has tennis courts available, along with a picnic pavilion, cooking grills and playgrounds for children.

Notable people
Noted people from Sacred Heart have included Ole Ramsland, a former member of the Minnesota House of Representatives, and his son Max Ramsland, who later moved to Canada and was elected as a member of the Legislative Assembly of Saskatchewan. Alpha Sunde Smaby, a former member of the Minnesota House of Representatives was born in Sacred Heart.

References

External links
http://www.sacredheartmn.org [Sacred Heart's Website]

Cities in Renville County, Minnesota
Cities in Minnesota